The 1948 United States Senate election in Alabama was held on November 2, 1948. 

Senator John Sparkman, who was first elected in 1946 to finish the incomplete term of John Bankhead II, was re-elected to a full term in office over Republican Paul Parsons.

Democratic primary

Candidates
 Phil Hamm
 Thomas F. Harlin
 Thomas H. Maxwell
 Wallace Pruitt
 John Sparkman, incumbent Senator

Results

General election

Results

See also 
 1948 United States Senate elections

References 

1948
Alabama
United States Senate